The Golden Lions are a rugby team based in Johannesburg, South Africa.

Golden Lions may also refer to:

Golden Lions, a Polish Film Award conferred at the Gdynia Film Festival
U.S. 106th Infantry Division, an infantry division nicknamed the Golden Lions
Arkansas-Pine Bluff Golden Lions, University of Arkansas sports teams
Dowling Golden Lions, college athletic teams in Oakdale, New York
Tianjin Golden Lions, a Chinese professional basketball team based in Tianjin
Shandong Golden Lions, a Chinese professional basketball team based in Jinan

See also
Golden Lion (disambiguation)